The , or New Inner Circle Building, is one of the highest buildings in Chiyoda ward in Tokyo. The building was completed on April 19, 2007, and opened to the public on April 27, 2007. It is often called "Shin Maru Biru" for short.

In Popular Culture: The Building was use as a frictional office building called "carrier man tradings" in an anime called Aggretsuko

Overview
The previous eight story high  was built there in 1952. The construction work of the current building began on March 15, 2005, and the building was one of the commercial complex buildings in Marunouchi Manhattan Plan, a redevelopment project in the Marunouchi area, following to the Marunouchi OAZO and the Tokyo Building TOKIA. The building was designed by Hopkins Architects of London.

The building contains office floors, and 153 stores are housed in total. The total construction cost was about 90 billion yen, and constructed by the Takenaka Corporation. The building was designed by British architect Sir Michael Hopkins, who won the Special Award of the Civic Trust Award for Sustainability in 2002.

The basement floor connects to Tokyo Station, as well as other nearby buildings.

References

External links 
 The Shin-Marunouchi Building 
 Marunouchi.com 
 Shin-Marunouchi Tower at the Hopkins Associates official website 

Marunouchi
Office buildings completed in 2007
Buildings and structures in Chiyoda, Tokyo
Mitsubishi Estate
Retail buildings in Tokyo
Skyscraper office buildings in Tokyo
2007 establishments in Japan